Thomas Lewis (of Harpton) (1518/1519 – 1607) was a Welsh politician.

The son of Hugh Lewis of Gladestry and Harpton, Thomas Lewis was appointed to the magistrates' bench in 1547 and also served as Sheriff of Radnorshire in 1547. He subsequently served in a large number of local posts, including as a capital burgess and common councilman of New Radnor.

Lewis served as the Member of Parliament for Radnor from 1545 to 1553, and for Radnorshire from 1559 to 1567 and 1584–1587.  He avoided the religious controversies of the day, although he was part of a commission designed to investigate an altar at New Radnor parish church which depicted Thomas Becket.

In 1566, Lewis bought the hill of Old Radnor from the Corporation of New Radnor.  He remained active into his old age, serving as Sheriff of Montgomeryshire in 1592–1593.

Lewis married twice, having at least five sons and a daughter, Sarah.

References

1510s births
1607 deaths
Members of the Parliament of England (pre-1707) for constituencies in Wales
High Sheriffs of Montgomeryshire
High Sheriffs of Radnorshire
17th-century English people
English MPs 1545–1547
English MPs 1547–1552
English MPs 1559
English MPs 1563–1567
English MPs 1584–1585
English MPs 1586–1587